Wagemans is a surname. Notable people with the surname include:

 Peter-Jan Wagemans (b. 1952) Dutch composer
 Julianus Wagemans (1890–1965) Belgian gymnast
 Bob Benny (born Emilius Wagemans, 1926—2011) was a Belgian singer and musical theatre performer

See also
 Waegemans
Wageman (disambiguation)